Tripp may refer to:

People
 Tripp (surname)
 Tripp (nickname)

Places in the United States
 Tripp, South Dakota, a city
 Tripp, Sunnyvale, Texas, a former town
 Tripp, West Virginia, an unincorporated community 
 Tripp, Wisconsin, a town
 Tripp County, South Dakota
 Tripp Lake, in Minnesota
Tripp Family Homestead, a historic house in Scranton, Pennsylvania
Tripp House and Store Complex at Durham, New York
Tripp Hill, a mountain in Central New York
Tripp Pinnacle, a summit in Central New York

Other
Mount Tripp in Antarctica
Tripp Trapp, an adjustable wooden high chair for children

See also
 Trip (disambiguation)
 Trippville, Wisconsin, an unincorporated community